The 2002 Úrvalsdeild was contested by 10 teams, and KR won the championship. Grindavík's Grétar Hjartarson was the top scorer with 13 goals.

League standings

Results
Each team played every opponent once home and away for a total of 18 matches.

References

Úrvalsdeild karla (football) seasons
1
Iceland
Iceland